Mary Joanna is an ep released in 1992 by The Stairs. As with other Stairs releases, it was issued in several formats: CD single, 7" vinyl, and 12" vinyl. The 7" vinyl release came with Stairtex Record Cleaner enclosed, supposedly a cd cleaner on one side, and a vinyl record cleaner on the other. The cleaner was actually a piece of sandpaper, the coarse side of which was supposed to be used to 'clean' cds.

Songs
I Can Only Give You Everything is a song originally performed by Them on their Them Again album and released in 1966. It was written by Phil Coulter (who also wrote the winning song from the 1967 Eurovision Song Contest, Puppet on a String performed by Sandie Shaw) and Tommy Scott, musician and producer.

Squashed Tomato Stomp is actually a cover of the Bo Diddley 1961 instrumental track Bo's Bounce.

UK 7" - Go!Disc 7" - GOD 79
Side A
 Mary Joanna
Side B
 I Can Only Give You Everything
 Squashed Tomato Stomp

UK 12" - Go!Disc 12" - GODX 79
Side A
 Mary Joanna
 Mad Song
Side B
 I Can Only Give You Everything
 Squashed Tomato Stomp

UK CD - Go!Disc CDS - GODCD 79
 Mary Joanna
 Mad Song
 I Can Only Give You Everything
 Squashed Tomato Stomp

The Stairs albums
1992 EPs